Temata is an islet in Penrhyn Atoll (Tongareva) in the Cook Islands. It is on the eastern edge of the atoll, between Patanga and Kavea.

References

Penrhyn atoll